Ramot Meir (lit. Meir Heights) is a moshav ovdim in central Israel. Located in the Shephelah around four kilometres south of Rehovot, it falls under the jurisdiction of Gezer Regional Council.

History
The moshav was founded in 1949 by demobilised soldiers, and was named after the American philanthropist Meyer Rosoff. Rosoff had bought the land around the Palestinian village of al-Na'ani in the 1930s for his company, Rosoff Group Plantations. After the 1948 war, it expanded on part of the remaining al-Na'ani land.

It collapsed in 1965, but was re-established in 1969 by a group of immigrants from France (who had originally moved there from North Africa)

References

External links

Official website 

Moshavim
Populated places established in 1949
Populated places in Central District (Israel)
1949 establishments in Israel
French-Jewish culture in Israel
North African-Jewish culture in Israel